Set of Six was a British sketch comedy show, broadcast in 1990, starring Rowland Rivron as the Scrote sextuplets. The series follows each of the brothers in turn. The series was narrated by Tony Bilbow, and the music created by Steve Nieve. Rivron describes it as 'a spoof fly-on-the-wall sociological documentary looking at the way different environments affect people'.

The Scrote brothers were born out of a Rivron character, Dr Martin Scrote, who appeared on Jonathan Ross's The Last Resort. The idea for a series was drawn up on a napkin by Rivron and Ian Brown in the Gay Hussar, a Soho restaurant.

Three episodes were directed by the cartoonist Gerald Scarfe, and three by John Stroud.

Episodes

Production 

The make-up was done by Dave Myers, better known as one half of The Hairy Bikers.

When shooting the David 'Top Shot' Scrote episode, Rivron met his wife-to-be who was working in the Royal Victoria Hotel he was staying at in Hastings.

References 

1990 British television series debuts
1990 British television series endings
1990s British television sketch shows
English-language television shows
Channel 4 comedy